George Zerdin Medalie (November 21, 1883 in New York City – March 5, 1946 in Albany, New York) was an American lawyer and politician.

Life
He graduated from Columbia College, Phi Beta Kappa, in 1905 and from Columbia Law School in 1907, and practiced law in New York City. He was Special Assistant New York State Attorney General in charge of the prosecution of election frauds from 1926 to 1928.

In 1931, he was appointed by President Herbert Hoover U.S. Attorney for the Southern District of New York. Medalie appointed Thomas E. Dewey as his Chief Assistant, and when Medalie resigned in November 1933, Dewey acted as U.S. Attorney for a month.

In 1932, he ran on the Republican ticket for U.S. Senator from New York, but was defeated by the incumbent Democrat Robert F. Wagner.

On September 28, 1945, he was appointed by Dewey, now Governor, to the New York Court of Appeals to fill the vacancy caused by the appointment of John T. Loughran as Chief Judge, and died in office.

He died of acute bronchitis.

Gladys Heldman was his daughter and Arthur Medalie was his son.  His grandchildren included Julie Heldman, Jeanne Temkin and G. Robert Medalie MD.

Sources
The History of the New York Court of Appeals, 1932-2003 by Bernard S. Meyer, Burton C. Agata & Seth H. Agata (page 22)
 Court of Appeals judges
JUDGE G.Z. MEDALIE DIES IN ALBANY AT 62 in NYT on March 6, 1946 (subscription required)

Judges of the New York Court of Appeals
1883 births
1946 deaths
Columbia Law School alumni
United States Attorneys for the Southern District of New York
20th-century American judges
Lawyers from New York City
20th-century American lawyers
Columbia College (New York) alumni